Hangzhou International School (杭州国际学校 hángzhōu guójì xuéxiào) is a nonprofit Early Years through Grade 12 (2–18 years of age) accredited educational institution serving over 725 students from the local expat population in Hangzhou, Zhejiang, China. It is the only fully accredited and authorized school in Hangzhou to offer all three IB Programs: the Primary Years Program (PYP), Middle Years Program (MYP), and Diploma Program (DP). The school is located in the affluent Binjiang District along the Qiantang River where the G20 Summit was held in 2016 and the Asian Games will be held in 2022. HIS will move to a purpose-built campus within the same Binjiang District in August 2022. The school is fully equipped and staffed to offer a comprehensive international program. The curriculum is taught in an English-medium and is specifically designed for international students from over 50 nationalities.  HIS benefits from the cooperation of its sister schools of the International School Development Foundation (ISDF) and Shanghai Community International School, who work together to standardize resources and programming.  Hangzhou International School has been accredited by the Western Association of Schools and Colleges (WASC) since 2005 and has been authorized as an International Baccalaureate (IB) World School since 2014.  It is also a member of the East Asia Regional Council of Overseas Schools (EARCOS) and the Association of China and Mongolia International Schools (ACAMIS).

History 
Hangzhou International School was founded in 2002 as a sister school to the Shanghai Community International School. HIS currently serves over 725 students in Early Years through Grade 12. HIS had its first graduating class in 2006 and is now serving over 30 students in each high school grade level.

See also
 List of international schools
 List of international schools in China
 Shanghai Community International Schools

References

Schools in Zhejiang
Association of China and Mongolia International Schools
International Baccalaureate schools in China
Educational institutions established in 2002
2002 establishments in China